The COVID-19 Immunity Task Force (CITF) is one of the Government of Canada's early efforts to track the 2020 coronavirus pandemic. An external, dedicated secretariat will help maximize the efficiency of the CITF's work.

Task Force membership
The CITF Board is composed of doctors, infectious disease experts, and policy makers.

Leadership Group

Executive Committee 
 David Naylor, Co-chair
 Catherine Hankins, Co-chair
 Timothy Evans, Executive Director
 Heather Hannah
 Mona Nemer
 Howard Njoo
 Gina Ogilvie
 Jutta Preiksaitis
 Gail Tomblin Murphy
 Paul Van Caeseele

Government of Canada representatives 

 Theresa Tam, Chief Public Health Officer of Canada
 Mona Nemer, Chief Science Advisor of Canada
 Stephen Lucas, Deputy Minister of Health of Canada

Members 
The CCITF leadership group expanded on 2 May 2020. Its additional members as of March 2022 are:

Provincial & Territorial representatives 

 Shelly Bolotin, Ontario
 Marguerite Cameron, Prince Edward Island
 Catherine Elliott, Yukon
 Richard Garceau, New Brunswick
 Heather Hannah, Northwest Territories
 Mel Krajden, British Columbia
 Christie Lutsiak, Alberta
 Richard Massé, Quebec
 Jessica Minion, Saskatchewan
 Michael Patterson, Nunavut
 Gail Tomblin Murphy, Nova Scotia
 Paul Van Caeseele, Manitoba

Purpose and goals
The CITF was to use a serology "to survey representative samples of the population for the presence of antibodies to the virus". Trudeau's press release on 23 April 2020, on the initiation of the CCITF listed several goals it would help to achieve notably that it would:

References

External links
 Types Of Corona Testing

COVID-19 pandemic in Canada
National responses to the COVID-19 pandemic
Health Canada
Clinical pathology
Serology
Blood tests
Epidemiology
Immunologic tests
Funding bodies of Canada
Scientific organizations based in Canada
Scientific organizations established in 2020
2020 establishments in Canada
Organizations established for the COVID-19 pandemic